Morris Knight (formerly known as Morrisson) is an American singer, songwriter, producer and musician from the San Francisco Bay Area. He is the lead singer, bassist, and principle songwriter of Dawn of Eros, a solo indie rock project he created in 2011. In the 1990s, he produced several demos in various musical genres including alternative hip-hop and trip-hop/neo soul. By the 2000s, he started producing more dance-oriented music. His earliest official releases were underground deep, soulful house tracks for various dance music producers including Bill Williams, Vincent Kwok, DJ MFR, BlackSonix, and Julius Papp.

In 2006, under the name Morrisson, he released a high-energy, disco-house track called "Love of My Life", which reached #15 on the Billboard Magazine Hot Dance Airplay in February 2006. It was featured as the club scene music in NBC's The New Normal season 1, episode 2, "Sofa's Choice". He frequently performed live in California as well as having performed in such places as Playa del Carmen, Mexico; Seoul, South Korea; Singapore, Thailand; and Shanghai.

However, by the beginning of 2011, Morris saw his musical endeavors beginning to move away from electronic dance music and toward a completely different genre of music. Having re-discovered his passion for playing bass guitar, his new music is now early 80's influenced indie rock/post-punk revival. A limited run of 250 copies of a 7" single was pressed up for the first two songs, "Rolling and Bouncing" and "Way They Are." The runout groove on "This Side" reads: "Initium sic finis," which loosely translates to "Thus, the beginning or the end." Morris also produced an official music video for "Rolling And Bouncing." His self-produced full-length debut rock album, was completed in Summer 2015. It was released under the name Dawn Of Eros and features a cover of The Smiths' single "Hand In Glove."

Between 2015 and 2019, he performed and recorded as the bassist for various San Francisco Bay Area-based rock bands including Uncle, Swamp Child and Redtrade.

In 2019 Morris Knight released the self-produced single "Thank You." The accompanying music video tells the story of a childhood friend lending him the first bass guitar he ever played. The video also features his interest in vintage VW's.

RADIO/TELEVISION CAREER

Morris Knight also maintains a full-time broadcast radio career that started in June 1990 at KWOD 106.5 in Sacramento, California. In 1992, he landed his first full-time on-air position at 97.7/98.3 KWIN in Stockton, California. In August 1997, Morris accepted the midday on-air personality position at 98.1 Kiss-FM in San Francisco, eventually moving to afternoon drive until April 2016. In June 2016 he continued his drive-time position at iHeart 80's at 103.7 (KOSF), San Francisco until January 2020. During that time, Morris appeared in numerous TV commercials and on-camera work in the San Francisco Bay Area, most notably hosting 80's-themed KOFY-TV Dance Party. He currently does afternoon drive for San Francisco's 96.5 KOIT and weekends on San Jose's 98.5 KUFX.

References

 Billboard Hot Dance Airplay (February 4, 2006) pg. 49
 www.tillatemagazine.com (July 2011) pg. 62

Musicians from California
Living people
Year of birth missing (living people)